Oshkosh may refer to:

Places in the United States
 Oshkosh, Wisconsin, city and the largest place with the name
 Oshkosh (town), Wisconsin
 Oshkosh Township, Yellow Medicine County, Minnesota
 Oshkosh, Nebraska
 Oshkosh Township, Wells County, North Dakota

Other
 Chief Oshkosh (1795–1858), chief of the Menominee American Indian tribe
 OshKosh B'gosh, a children's apparel company headquartered in Oshkosh, Wisconsin
 Oshkosh Corporation, an American company that designs and builds specialty trucks, military vehicles, truck bodies and access equipment
 EAA AirVenture Oshkosh, an aviation enthusiast gathering held each year at the end of July in Oshkosh, Wisconsin
 University of Wisconsin–Oshkosh
 Glacial Lake Oshkosh, a glacial lake in the Oshkosh, Wisconsin area, ancestral to Lake Winnebago